The 22137 / 22138 Nagpur–Ahmedabad Prerana Express is an Express train belonging to Indian Railways that runs between  and  in India.

It operates as train number 22138 from Ahmedabad Junction to Nagpur Junction and as train number 22137 in the reverse direction.

Coaches

The 22137/22138 Nagpur–Ahmedabad Prerana Express presently has LHB coach, 1 AC 2-tier, 3 AC 3-tier, 9 Sleeper class, 2 General unreserved and 2 EoG.

As with most train services in India, coach composition may be amended at the discretion of Indian Railways depending on demand.

Service

The 11454 Nagpur–Ahmedabad Prerana Express covers the distance of 957 kilometres in 18 hours 10 mins (52.68 km/hr) and in 19 hours 40 mins (48.66 km/hr) as 11453 Ahmedabad–Nagpur Prerana Express.

As the average speed of the train is below 55 km/hr, as per Indian Railways rules, its fare does not include a Superfast surcharge.

Route and halts

Traction

It is hauled by a powerful Ajni-based WAP-7 (HOG)-equipped locomotive on its entire journey.

Rake sharing
The train shares its rake with 11203/11204 Nagpur–Jaipur Weekly Express.

Time Table

 22137 Nagpur–Ahmedabad Prerana Express leaves Nagpur Junction every Wednesday, Saturday and Sunday at 10:30 hrs IST and reaches Ahmedabad Junction at 03:35 hrs IST the next day.
 22138 Ahmedabad–Nagpur Prerana Express leaves Ahmedabad Junction every Tuesday, Thursday and Sunday at 17:20 hrs IST and reaches Nagpur Junction at 10:40 hrs IST the next day.

Schedule

External links
 
  ICRTC
  IRFCA

References 

Transport in Nagpur
Express trains in India
Rail transport in Maharashtra
Rail transport in Gujarat
Transport in Ahmedabad
Named passenger trains of India